Leo-Pekka Tähti (born 22 June 1983 in Pori, Finland) is an athlete and Paralympian from Finland competing mainly in category T54 sprint events.

He won the gold medal in the 100m and 200m events at the 2004 Summer Paralympics in Athens, Greece. He also competed in the 2008 Summer Paralympics in Beijing, China, winning a gold medal in the men's 100 metres – T54 event and a bronze medal in the men's 200 metres – T54 event. In the 2012 Paralympics in London, United Kingdom, he won the gold medal in the 100 metre T54 event after recording a new world record 13.63 in the qualifying round

References 

 

1983 births
Living people
Paralympic athletes of Finland
Paralympic gold medalists for Finland
Paralympic bronze medalists for Finland
World record holders in Paralympic athletics
Medalists at the 2004 Summer Paralympics
Medalists at the 2008 Summer Paralympics
Medalists at the 2012 Summer Paralympics
Athletes (track and field) at the 2004 Summer Paralympics
Athletes (track and field) at the 2008 Summer Paralympics
Athletes (track and field) at the 2012 Summer Paralympics
Medalists at the 2016 Summer Paralympics
Medalists at the World Para Athletics Championships
Medalists at the World Para Athletics European Championships
Paralympic medalists in athletics (track and field)
Finnish male wheelchair racers
Athletes (track and field) at the 2020 Summer Paralympics
Sportspeople from Pori
20th-century Finnish people
21st-century Finnish people